Film production companies of the United States